Rainbow Takeaway is the eighth studio album by Kevin Ayers. The core band is essentially the same as its predecessor, Yes We Have No Mañanas (So Get Your Mañanas Today). Rainbow Takeaway marks the close of the 1970s Ayers progressive sound, with Billy Livsey’s synthesizer flourishes on "A View from the Mountain" providing a final coda to that era. Soul and Country elements are also present on Rainbow Takeaway coupled with the reggae rhythms on the standout track "Beware of the Dog II".  The eccentric Ayers mélange is in full effect on the chaotic closer "Hat Song". Ayers retired to Deià, Spain shortly after the album’s release.

Track listing
All tracks composed by Kevin Ayers

 "Blaming It All on Love" – 3:00
 "Ballad of a Salesman Who Sold Himself" – 4:30
 "A View from the Mountain" – 6:15
 "Rainbow Takeaway" – 3:50
 "Waltz for You" – 5:22
 "Beware of the Dog II" – 5:59
 "Strange Song" – 2:41
 "Goodnight Goodnight" – 3:06
 "Hat Song" – 1:17

Personnel

Musicians
 Kevin Ayers – guitar, vocals
 Ollie Halsall – guitar
 Billy Livsey – keyboards
 Rob Townsend – drums
 Charles McCracken – bass, guitar
 Anthony Moore – keyboards
  – violin
 Barry DeSouza – drums

Technical
 Anthony Moore – producer
 Kevin Ayers – producer
 Brian Palmer – art direction
 Sharon Coventry – artwork
 Peter Vernon – photography

References

1978 albums
Kevin Ayers albums
Harvest Records albums
Albums produced by Kevin Ayers